Desulfovibrio aerotolerans  is a Gram-negative, mesophilic, sulphate-reducing and oxygen tolerant bacterium from the genus of Desulfovibrio which has been isolated from activated sludge in Denmark.

References

External links
Type strain of Desulfovibrio aerotolerans at BacDive -  the Bacterial Diversity Metadatabase	

Bacteria described in 2009
Desulfovibrio